Jasminum officinale, known as the common jasmine or simply jasmine, is a species of flowering plant in the olive family Oleaceae. It is native to the Caucasus and parts of Asia, also widely naturalized.

It is also known as summer jasmine, poet's jasmine, white jasmine, true jasmine or jessamine, and is particularly valued by gardeners throughout the temperate world for the intense fragrance of its flowers in summer. It is also the National flower of Pakistan.

Description
Jasminum officinale is a vigorous, twining deciduous climber with sharply pointed pinnate leaves and clusters of starry, pure white flowers in summer, which are the source of its heady scent. The leaf has 5 to 9 leaflets.

Etymology
The Latin specific epithet officinale means "useful".

Distribution
It is found in the Caucasus, northern Iran, Afghanistan, Pakistan, the Himalayas, Tajikistan, India, Nepal and western China (Guizhou, Sichuan, Xizang (Tibet), Yunnan). The species is also widely cultivated in many places, and is reportedly naturalized in Spain, France, Italy, Portugal, Romania, Croatia, Bosnia and Herzegovina, Montenegro, Serbia, Algeria, Florida and the West Indies.

Chemical composition
J. officinale has been found to contain alkaloids, coumarins, flavonoids, tannins, terpenoids, glycosides, emodine, leucoanthocyanins, steroids, anthocyanins, phlobatinins, essential oil and saponins.

Garden history
Jasminum officinale is so ancient in cultivation that its country of origin, though somewhere in Central Asia, is not certain. H.L. Li, The Garden Flowers of China,  notes that in the third century CE, jasmines identifiable as J. officinale and J. sambac were recorded among "foreign" plants in Chinese texts, and that in ninth-century Chinese texts J. officinale was said to come from Byzantium. Its Chinese name, Yeh-hsi-ming is a version of the Persian and Arabic name.

Its entry into European gardens was most likely through the Arab-Norman culture of Sicily, but, as the garden historian John Harvey has said, "surprisingly little is known, historically or archaeologically, of the cultural life of pre-Norman Sicily". In the mid-14th century the Florentine author Boccaccio in his Decameron describes a walled garden in which "the sides of the alleys were all, as it were, walled in with roses white and red and jasmine; insomuch that there was no part of the garden but one might walk there not merely in the morning but at high noon in grateful shade." Jasmine water also features in the story of Salabaetto in the Decameron. Jasminum officinale, "of the household office" where perfumes were distilled, was so thoroughly naturalized that Linnaeus thought it was native to Switzerland. As a garden plant in London it features in William Turner's Names of Herbes, 1548.

Double forms, here as among many flowers, were treasured in the 16th and 17th centuries.

Cultivars
Numerous cultivars have been developed for garden use, often with variegated foliage. The cultivar 'Argenteovariegatum', with cream-white variegation on the leaves, has gained the Royal Horticultural Society's Award of Garden Merit.

Aromatherapy and herbal medicine

The essential oil of Jasminum officinale is used in aromatherapy. Jasmine absolute is known as the 'King of Oils', and its heavy, sweet scent is valued by perfumers. The flowers release their perfume at dusk, so flowers are picked at night and a tiny amount of oil is obtained from each blossom by solvent extraction. The result is a very expensive oil which can be used in low concentrations.

In herbal medicine, it is used on the skin as either an antiseptic or anti-inflammatory agent.

Jasminum officinale var. grandiflorum is a folk medicine used for the treatment of hepatitis in the south of China. It has shown anti-viral activity in vitro.

The effect of an aqueous extract of fresh floral buds of Jasminum officinale var. grandiflorum Linn. has been studied on female fertility in rats. The extract produced a significant decrease in serum progesterone levels.

Safety
A major component of jasmine is benzyl acetate (~25%) which is known to be absorbed through the skin and known to be an allergenic sensitizer. Those who show allergies to spicy food, perfumes and cosmetics are most likely to react. However, the power of the scent is such that only tiny amounts are required. Jasmine is also an emmenagogue and therefore should not be used during pregnancy.

References

officinale
Flora of Western Asia
Flora of the Indian subcontinent
Flora of Tajikistan
Flora of Tibet
Flora of Guizhou
Flora of Sichuan
Flora of Yunnan
Plants described in 1753
Taxa named by Carl Linnaeus
National symbols of Pakistan
Dermatologic drugs
Medicinal plants of Asia
Garden plants of Asia